Shirley, Lady Porter DBE, (née Cohen; born 29 November 1930), styled between 1991 and 2003 as Dame Shirley Porter, is a British politician who led Westminster City Council in London, representing the Conservative Party. She is the daughter and heiress of Sir Jack Cohen, the founder of Tesco supermarkets. She was appointed Dame Commander of the Order of the British Empire in 1991 by John Major after delivering victory in Westminster for the Conservatives in the 1990 elections, but was stripped of this title in 2003. 

While leader of Westminster City Council, Porter oversaw the "Building Stable Communities" policy — later described as the "homes for votes scandal" — and was consequently accused of gerrymandering. The policy was judged illegal by the district auditor, and a surcharge of £27m levied on her in 1996. This was later raised to £42 million with interest and costs. She eventually settled in 2004, paying a final settlement of £12.3 million.

Porter moved to Herzliya Pituah, Israel in 1994 during the inquiry, and returned to London in 2006. She helped establish the Porter Centre for Environmental Studies at Tel Aviv University, which opened in 2014.

Background and political career
Shirley Cohen was born in Upper Clapton, London, on 29 November 1930. Her father, Jacob Edward "Jack" Cohen, was the founder and owner of Tesco, and her mother was Sarah "Cissie" (née Fox), the daughter of a master tailor. Cohen opened the first two Tesco stores in 1931. By 1939, he owned over 100 Tesco stores across the country. The family lived at 7 Gunton Road, Hackney, a former council house in the East End of London that Jack had purchased from Hackney Council with the help of a £1,000 council loan.

Between 1939 and 1945 she boarded at Warren School For Girls in Worthing, Sussex. She then spent a year at La Ramée, a finishing school in Lausanne, Switzerland, followed by a year at St. Godric's Secretarial and Language School in Hampstead, London. She married Leslie Porter (10 July 1920 – 20 March 2005) on 26 June 1949 at the New West End Synagogue, Paddington, London. They had a son, John, who died in 2021; as well as a daughter. In 1960, Porter was involved in the exposure of ten golf clubs in north London for discriminating against Jews.

Shirley Porter became a magistrate before entering local politics. Looking back at that time, she said "I remember my great lack of confidence, that I came in there and for the first time and I wasn't somebody’s daughter, somebody’s wife, somebody’s mother. That’s a very very mind-boggling feeling." In 1974, she was elected to Westminster City Council as a Conservative councillor for Hyde Park Ward. In the early 1980s, she chaired the Environment Committee, calling for strict enforcement of litter laws.

In 1983, she was elected as leader of the council. Her initiatives and policies included the Say No to Drugs Campaign and the Plain English Campaign and she was also involved in the abolition of the Greater London Council. She became the Lord Mayor of Westminster in 1990. after delivering victory in Westminster for the Conservatives, she was appointed Dame Commander of the Order of the British Empire in 1991 by John Major.

Initiatives

Litter
Earlier in her career, Porter garnered national attention for her involvement and implementation of anti-litter campaigns in Westminster. In a 1985 interview with The Times''' Shirley Lowe, Porter explained that litter was the reason why she had first entered local politics in 1974. She said: "I was walking along the street with a friend one day and it was filthy and I said, 'My God, somebody ought to do something about this,' and my friend said 'Why don't you?'" Despite sitting on the Highways and Works Committee, which was responsible for street cleaning and refuse collection, Porter did not mention litter again until late 1976 following a visit to Leningrad and Moscow. On her return she told the Paddington Mercury of her distaste for the Soviet regime but continued "one thing they must be given credit for is the cleanliness you find everywhere... I should hate to think that we need such a repressive regime to get our cities cleaned to their standards."

She soon joined the "Clean Up London" campaign. She encouraged hoteliers to join forces to attack the squalor that was affecting their businesses. Her enthusiasm also aided her election as vice-chairman of Highways and Work on 28 June 1977. Her anti-litter activities within the CUL campaign continued. The Paddington Mercury described Porter as "fast winning a reputation as Paddington's Mrs Mops". She also mobilised schoolchildren in her campaign, raising brooms over their shoulders like rifles at the Lord Mayor's Show and singing "Pick up your litter and put it in the bin". By 1978, Porter had been elected as Chairman of the Highways and Works Committee, in the same year she launched the "Mr Clean Up" anti-litter campaign.

In January 1979, a series of strikes began to unfold as part of the "Winter of Discontent". Westminster was struck by the striking rubbish collectors and mounting waste in the streets. As a result, Porter opened thirty-three emergency rubbish dumps across the borough. Porter told press reporters that they would privatise rubbish collection if the strikers did not return to work. This practice was installed later on.

Porter's successive litter campaigns included the "Cleaner London Campaign", followed by the "Cleaner City Initiative" in 1980. Activities included the deployment of additional street sweepers in particularly squalor-ridden areas of Westminster for a 2–3 week period. Porter also increased the regularity of rubbish collections and convinced local businesses to sponsor litter bins.

She threatened to resign in September 1980 when her department of Highways and Works faced a £1 million budget cut; "I will resign in the event that they cut our basic services and that means keeping our frontline services and a clean and litter-free city." In 1981, Porter launched "Operation Spring Clean", a cleaning blitz of the West End.

In a 1991 appearance on Desert Island Discs, Porter said: "I really just feel so strongly that it isn't right for people to live in a dirty environment, and in an unpleasant environment. And it isn't just litter: I’m talking about the whole quality of life. When you live in pleasant surroundings, I think you are a better person."

Soho sex trade
In the late 1970s, Soho residents were troubled by the growing sex industry. Between 1965 and 1982, the number of sex shops had risen from 31 to 65. In 1982 Porter became Chairman of the General Purposes Committee and set to work in alleviating the issue. Porter and her aides soon proceeded with a fact-finding mission. The Local Government (Miscellaneous Provisions) Act 1982 stipulated that Westminster could shut down any pornographer that did not hold a licence. Porter soon decided that the number of sex shops in Soho would be limited to 20. The legislation also ensured that any successful applicants would require a minimum of six months residency in the UK as well as a clean police record. It was also legislated that sex shops would have to conceal their practice with blinds. Other measures included the requirement of business owners to keep a register of their staff. By February 1983, just 13 sex shops remained in Soho.

Homes for votes scandal

The Conservatives were narrowly re-elected in Westminster in the 1986 local council elections. Fearing that they would eventually lose control unless there was a permanent change in the social composition of the borough, Porter instituted a secret policy known as 'Building Stable Communities'.

Eight wards were selected as 'key wards' – in public it was claimed that these wards were subject to particular 'stress factors' leading to a decline in the population of Westminster. In reality, secret documents showed that the wards most subject to these stress factors were rather different, and that the eight wards chosen had been the most marginal in the City Council elections of 1986. Three – Bayswater, Maida Vale and Millbank, had been narrowly won by Labour, a further three, St James's, Victoria and Cavendish had been narrowly lost by them, in West End ward an Independent had split the two seats with the Conservatives, while in Hamilton Terrace the Conservatives were threatened by the Social Democratic Party.

An important part of this policy was the designation of much of Westminster's council housing for commercial sale, rather than re-letting when the properties became vacant. The designated housing was concentrated in those wards most likely to change hands to Labour in the elections. Much of this designated housing lay vacant for months or even years before it could be sold. To prevent its occupation by squatters or drug dealers, these flats were fitted with security doors provided by the company Sitex at a cost to local tax payers of £50 per week per door.

Other council services were subverted to ensure the re-election of the majority party in the 1990 elections. In services such as street cleaning, pavement repair and environmental improvements, marginal wards were given priority while safely Labour and safely Conservative parts of the city were neglected.

Another vital part of 'Building Stable Communities' was the removal of homeless voters and others who lived in hostels and were perceived less likely to vote Conservative, such as students and nurses, from the City of Westminster. While this initially proved successful, other Councils in London and the Home Counties soon became aware of homeless individuals and families from Westminster, many with complex mental health and addiction problems, being relocated to their area.

As the City Council found it more and more difficult to move homeless people outside Westminster, increasingly the logic of the 'Building Stable Communities' programme required the concentration of homeless people within safe wards in the city. In 1989 over 100 homeless families were removed from hostels in marginal wards and placed in the Hermes and Chantry Point tower blocks in the safe Labour ward of Harrow Road. These blocks contained a dangerous form of asbestos, and should have either been cleaned up or demolished a decade before, but had remained in place due to funding disputes between the City Council and the by now abolished Greater London Council. Many of the flats had had their heating and sanitation systems destroyed by the council to prevent their use as drug dens, others had indeed been taken over by heroin users and still others had pigeons making nests out of asbestos, with the level in flats in Hermes and Chantry Points well above safe norms. One former homeless refuge was sold off at a discounted price to private developers and converted into private flats for young professional people at a cost to the ratepayer of £2.6 million.

Labour councillors and members of the public referred this policy to the District Auditor to check on its legality, and as a result it was ordered to be halted in 1989 whilst investigations continued. In 1990, the Conservatives were re-elected in Westminster in a landslide election victory in which they won all but one of the wards targeted by Building Stable Communities.

Porter stood down as Leader of the council in 1991, and served in the ceremonial position of Lord Mayor of Westminster in 1991–92. She resigned from the council in 1993, and retired to live in Israel with her husband.

Court cases and surcharge
In May 1996, after legal investigation work, the District Auditor finally concluded that the 'Building Stable Communities' policy had been illegal, and ordered Porter and five others to pay the cost of the illegal policy, which were calculated as £31.6 million. This judgement was upheld by the High Court in 1997 with liability reduced solely to Porter and her Deputy Leader, David Weeks. After the judgement, the scandal and its effects were discussed in Parliament on 14 May 1996.

In 1998, BBC2 screened a documentary, Looking for Shirley, which profiled Westminster City Council's efforts to recover the surcharge and Porter's efforts to move her estimated £70m assets into offshore accounts and overseas investments.

The Court of Appeal overturned the judgement in 1999, but the House of Lords reinstated it in 2001 (see Porter v Magill [2001] UKHL 67, [2002] 2 AC 357). Including interest, the surcharge now stood at £43.3 million. In Israel, Porter transferred substantial parts of her great wealth to other members of her family and into secret trusts in an effort to avoid the charge, and subsequently claimed assets of only £300,000.

Final agreement
On 24 April 2004, the still Conservative controlled Westminster City Council and the Audit Commission announced that an agreement had been reached for a payment of £12.3 million in settlement of the debt. The council declared that the cost of legal action would be far greater than the amount to be recovered, while Porter still maintained her innocence. The decision was appealed by Labour members on the Council and the District Auditor began another investigation. The ensuing report, issued on 15 March 2007, accepted the position of the council that further action would not be cost effective. The Auditor further stated that Westminster had recovered substantially all of Porter's personal wealth and had acted at all times in the best interests of the taxpayers of the city.

In November 2009, ahead of a BBC radio play, Shirleymander, dramatising the principal events of Shirley Porter's time as leader at Westminster council, Council leader Colin Barrow apologised unreservedly to all those affected by the "gerrymandering" policy. He criticised Shirley Porter by name for the first time and added that her actions were "the opposite of the council's policies today".

The Labour Party in London has continued its pursuit of Porter and following the settlement, Porter has returned to Westminster to live, buying a £1.5m flat with family money.  The former Mayor of London, Ken Livingstone, subsequently requested that Lord Goldsmith, the Attorney General, commence an investigation as to whether or not Porter committed perjury or other offences, during the conduct of the 'homes for votes' case.

Westminster cemeteries scandal

The Westminster cemeteries scandal was a British political scandal which began in January 1987 when Westminster City Council sold three cemeteries, three lodges, one flat, a crematorium and over 12 acres of prime development land in London for a total of 85 pence, on Porter's orders; the cemeteries were re-sold by the purchaser for £1.25 million on the same day that he had acquired them.

Residence
It is in question whether Porter is now a full-time resident in the United Kingdom, considering her commitments to the Porter Foundation and the trust's various Israel-based projects. In November 2007, The Jerusalem Post cited her as a "permanent fixture" at the annual Balfour Dinner hosted by the Israel Britain and Commonwealth Association, as she does "reside in Israel".

Philanthropy
Porter was a governor of Tel Aviv University.

The Porter Foundation is a UK-registered charitable trust established in 1970 by the family of Sir Jack Cohen. In particular, Lady Porter and her late husband, Sir Leslie Porter, donated funds to causes such as Tel Aviv University, where the latter became chancellor. The foundation has given several naming donations to the University: the Porter Institute for Poetics and Semiotics, the Cohen-Porter Family Swimming Pool, the Shirley and Leslie Porter School of Cultural Studies, the Cohen-Porter United Kingdom Building of Life Sciences, the Porter Super Centre for Environmental and Ecological Research. The foundation also provides scholarships and has paid for equipment and books.

In 2000, the Porter Foundation, then headed by (then Dame) Shirley Porter, founded the Porter School of Environmental Studies (PSES) at Tel Aviv University as a multi-disciplinary school of environmental studies. Porter was personally involved in the design and construction of the school's new building on the Tel Aviv University campus. The LEED Platinum-graded building was scheduled to open in May 2014. It has been built according to international standards of energy-efficient and environmentally sensitive design, making it the University's first "green building" and one of the first of its kind in Israel. The building's capsule design and energy-saving features was designed to make it a "living laboratory" for teaching and research on green architecture, both within the University and outside academia.

In addition to founding the PSES, Porter has been involved with the Council for a Beautiful Israel and the Society for the Protection of Nature in Israel, and on 23 April 2009 she was awarded the prestigious 'Green Globe' award for her contribution to Israel's environmental movement.

Another philanthropic project funded by the Porter Foundation is the Porter Senior Citizen Centre in Jaffa, a facility for elderly and poor Jews in the area (mostly Sephardic Bulgarians).

The Porter Foundation also built the Daniel Marcus Nautical Centre, in memory of Lady Shirley and Sir Leslie Porter's grandson Daniel Amichai Marcus who was killed in a car crash in Israel in 1993 at the age of 21 while on vacation with friends from their military service.

Other causes include endowing galleries in Britain's National Portrait Gallery, where The Porter Gallery exists on the ground floor, the Royal Academy and the V&A.

Public image and portrayals
In a review for The Guardian of Nothing Like a Dame, Porter's biography by journalist Andrew Hosken, Nicholas Lezard described her in the following terms: "She remains, by a considerable margin, the most corrupt British public figure in living memory, with the possible exception of Robert Maxwell". In the London Review of Books review of the same book Jenny Diski called the Homes for Votes scandal Porter's "biggest, stupidest and most cynical act of corruption". Diski, without justifying Porter's behaviour, accused many of Porter's critics of "snobbery and an undeclared racism". She cited the "echo of something more than simple class snobbery in the judgments made of her voice and decor".

In November 2009, BBC Radio 4 broadcast the radio play Shirleymander, which dramatised the events of Porter's time as leader of Westminster City Council, with the role of Porter played by Tracy Ann Oberman. In 2018, a stage adaptation of the play starred Jessica Martin as Porter and had a brief run at the Playground Theatre in North Kensington, west London.

See also
Gerrymandering
List of philanthropistsShirleymanderWestminster cemeteries scandalWestminster City Council v Duke of Westminster''

References

Notes

Footnotes

Bibliography

External links
The Porter School of Environmental Studies
The Porter Institute for Poetics and Semiotics

Shirley and Leslie Porter School of Cultural Studies

1930 births
English Ashkenazi Jews
English people of Polish-Jewish descent
Israeli Ashkenazi Jews
People from Upper Clapton
Councillors in the City of Westminster
Conservative Party (UK) councillors
Dames Commander of the Order of the British Empire
Living people
English philanthropists
English environmentalists
British women environmentalists
Israeli environmentalists
Israeli women environmentalists
Tesco people
Tel Aviv University
20th-century Israeli women politicians
Jewish British politicians
English people of Russian-Jewish descent
Leaders of local authorities of England
Homes for votes scandal
Women councillors in England
Wives of knights
Deputy Lieutenants of Greater London